Henricus Antonius Cornelis Marie "Harrij" Notenboom (born 31 August 1926) is a Dutch retired politician. He served as member of the House of Representatives from 1963 to 1979 and in the European Parliament from 1971 to 1984. Notenboom was a member of the Catholic People's Party and later the Christian Democratic Appeal when the former had merged into it in 1980.

Notenboom criticized the budget as proposed by Cals.

Career
Notenboom was born in Roosendaal. He was adjunct secretary of the Nederlandse Rooms-Katholieke Middenstandsbond from September 1952 to January 1956. He subsequently served as director of the Katholieke Limburgse Middenstandsbond until 1969.

In 1988 he obtained his title of doctor in economic sciences with a thesis on budget law of the European Parliament.

References

External links
 Profile on Parlement.com
 Profile on European Parliament

1926 births
Living people
Catholic People's Party MEPs
Catholic People's Party politicians
Christian Democratic Appeal MEPs
Christian Democratic Appeal politicians
Academic staff of the Eindhoven University of Technology
Members of the House of Representatives (Netherlands)
MEPs for the Netherlands 1958–1979
MEPs for the Netherlands 1979–1984
People from Roosendaal